Littletown was a census-designated place (CDP) in Pima County, Arizona, United States. The population was 1,010 at the 2000 census. The area was annexed into Tucson in 2017.

Geography
Littletown is located at  (32.132144, -110.877003).

Littletown is located on Interstate 10, southeast of Drexel-Alvernon. It was mostly surrounded by Tucson until it became part of the city.

Demographics

At the 2000 census there were 1,010 people, 313 households, and 244 families living in the CDP. The racial makeup of the CDP was 64.1% White, 2.1% Black or African American, 2.7% Native American, 0.2% Asian, 24.9% from other races, and 6.1% from two or more races.  50.4% of the population were Hispanic or Latino of any race.
Of the 313 households 41.2% had children under the age of 18 living with them, 55.0% were married couples living together, 16.0% had a female householder with no husband present, and 22.0% were non-families. 17.3% of households were one person and 4.2% were one person aged 65 or older.  The average household size was 3.23 and the average family size was 3.66.

The age distribution was 33.6% under the age of 18, 10.7% from 18 to 24, 26.5% from 25 to 44, 22.8% from 45 to 64, and 6.4% 65 or older.  The median age was 30 years. For every 100 females, there were 96.1 males.  For every 100 females age 18 and over, there were 92.3 males.

The median household income was $35,833 and the median family income  was $35,046. Males had a median income of $26,394 versus $17,396 for females. The per capita income for the CDP was $8,892.  About 7.7% of families and 9.7% of the population were below the poverty line, including 7.5% of those under age 18 and 65.2% of those age 65 or over.

Education
The former CDP is served by Craycroft Elementary School, Billy Lane Laufer Middle School, and Desert View High School, all part of the Sunnyside Unified School District.

References

Census-designated places in Pima County, Arizona
Populated places in the Sonoran Desert